California Avenue station is a Caltrain station located in Palo Alto, California.  It stops at the historical town center of Mayfield, which was annexed by the town of Palo Alto in 1925. The current station structure was built in 1983 and the station was expanded from one platform to two in 2008.

History

Rail service to Mayfield from San Francisco began in 1863; until January 1864 passengers had to transfer to a stagecoach to continue to San Jose. The first station was approximately half a mile northwest of the current site; it was relocated two years later after residents complained the location was inconvenient and William Paul, a storekeeper and benefactor of the town, donated land on what was then Lincoln Street. The station built in 1869 was replaced in 1955, and again in 1983 in conjunction with the development of the nearby Palo Alto Central condominium complex. After Palo Alto annexed Mayfield in 1925, Lincoln Street was renamed to California Avenue because Palo Alto already had a Lincoln Street; the station took that name in 1941.

Until 2008, the station had a central boarding platform and could only accommodate one train at a time, necessitating a hold-out rule. That year the station was reconfigured to have two outside platforms and a pedestrian underpass replaced the former at-grade crossing, eliminating the need for the hold-out rule. A fence between the tracks helps keep passengers off the tracks. A ticket vending machine is located at the entrance to the pedestrian underpass so that people can buy or validate their tickets before going to the northbound platform. New shelters for passengers needing assistance are located at the northern end of the platforms, next to the manual wheelchair lifts. The shelters have been modified to accommodate wheelchairs.

References

External links

Caltrain - California Avenue station

Caltrain stations in Santa Clara County, California
Railway stations in the United States opened in 1869
Railway stations in the United States opened in 1983